The Juventud Rebelde is a Cuban newspaper of the Young Communist League.

Overview
On October 21, 1965 Fidel Castro described the newspaper as "a paper devoted mainly to youth, with things of interest to young people, but that must try to be a quality newspaper whose content could be interesting to all kinds of readers."

Juventud Rebelde, reggaetón, and sexuality  
The newspaper has published articles by journalists demonstrating a stance against reggaetón. The paper claims that "something must be done" about the music style that has become popular among youth, as artists in the genre commonly glorify "luxury, lust, vice" and the use of drugs and alcohol. The vice that the paper sees reggaetón as promoting encompasses everything from violence to dressing in a certain fashion to sexual behavior. Sexual behavior, the  newspaper has argued, is promoted by all aspects of the genre, from the "repetitive beats" and "suggestive lyrics" to the "licentious dance moves", which the paper likens to "making love with clothes on."

The heightened level of misogyny has also been expressed by journalists, pointing out that "the viewpoint of coarse and crude male domination — constantly minimizing the conscience of the feminine sex — that oozes from (reggaeton) lyrics, is simply degrading."

Although Juventud Rebelde takes such a hard stance against the loose sexual morals that it claims reggaetón artists hold, the newspaper has also been known to hold an "open, healthy non-judgmental attitude toward sexuality". A regular feature of the periodical is a semi-scientific series of articles written by a Cuban sex therapist that includes detailed information on subjects like "the G-spot".

References

External links 
 Juventud Rebelde website 
 Juventud Rebelde website 

Newspapers published in Cuba